PTC Alliance Holdings Corp is an international corporation specializing in steel products. It is a leading worldwide manufacturer of Electric Resistance Welded (ERW) and Drawn Over Mandrel (DOM) mechanical steel tube. They also create shaped tube, chrome rod, and fabricated steel components. The corporation can trace its roots to the formation of Pittsburgh Tube in 1924.  It is headquartered in the Pittsburgh suburb of Wexford, PA. PTC Alliance has 8 manufacturing facilities in the U.S.A. PTC Alliance has sales offices in the UK, Australia, and Chennai, India.

U.S. Manufacturing locations: 
PTC Alliance is controlled by Black Diamond Capital Management, a private equity firm.

External links
 PTC Alliance Corporate Web Site
 Enduro Chrome Rod Web Site

Tubing (material)
Companies based in Pittsburgh